Arukharka  is a village development committee in Syangja District in the Gandaki Zone of central Nepal. At the time of the 2011 Nepal census it had a population of 3,397 people living in 878 individual households. The VDC office is located at the sherbazzar which is the VDC center. This is approximately 4 km from Sarketari bazzar of Siddhartha Highway. 
This VDC consists of one Higher Secondary School Name as Jana Adarsa Higher Secondary School.

References

External links
UN map of the municipalities of Syangja District

Populated places in Syangja District